Nasunaris flata is an extinct genus of ostracods which existed in the United Kingdom during the Silurian period. It was first named by David J. Siveter, Derek E. G. Briggs, Derek J. Siveter and Mark D. Sutton in 2010.

See also
2010 in paleontology

References

Myodocopida
Prehistoric ostracod genera
Silurian animals
Fossil taxa described in 2010
Monotypic crustacean genera
Fossils of Great Britain